We Found Heaven Right Here on Earth at "4033" is an album by American country music artist George Jones released in 1966 on the Musicor Records label.  The album features "Walk Through This World With Me", which would become a number one hit for Jones in 1967, his first chart topper in five years. According to Bob Allen's book George Jones: The Life and Times of a Honky Tonk Legend, Jones was less than enthusiastic about the "musically middle-of-the-road love ballad that was almost inspirational in its unabashedly optimistic and romantic sentiments – a far cry from 'The Window Up Above,'" and it was only at his producer H.W. "Pappy" Daily's insistence that he recorded the song at all. "From Here To The Door" was written by Don Chapel, who was married to Tammy Wynette at the time.  We Found Heaven Right Here on Earth at "4033" would rise to number 3 on the country album chart.

Track listing
"Four-O-Thirty Three" (Earl Montgomery)
"From Here to the Door" (Don Chapel)
"Back Into My Baby's Arms Again" (Dallas Frazier, A. L. Owens)
"Ain't Nothin' Shakin' (But the Leaves)" (Eddie Fontaine/Cirino Colacrai/Diane Lampert/John Gluck Jr.)
"In Person" (Lynn Anderson)
"Developing My Picture" (Earl Montgomery)
"Please Don't Let That Woman Get Me" (Dallas Frazier)
"Walk Through This World with Me" (Kay Savage, Sandra Seamons)
"Your Steppin' Stone" (Bozo Darnell/Major Luper)
"Don't Keep Me Lonely Too Long" (Melba Montgomery)

Personnel
The Jordanaires – vocal accompaniment

References

External links
 George Jones' Official Website

1966 albums
George Jones albums
Albums produced by Pappy Daily
Musicor Records albums